Nadezhda Valeriyevna Alexandrova (born 3 January 1986) is a Russian ice hockey goaltender, who most recently played with Tornado Moscow Region of the Women's Hockey League (ZhHL) in the 2018–19 season. As a member of the Russian national team, she won bronze at the 2013 IIHF Women's World Championship and competed at the 2017 IIHF World Women's Championship. She played with the Olympic Athletes from Russia (OAR) in the women's ice hockey tournament at the 2018 Winter Olympics.

References

External links

1986 births
Living people
Russian women's ice hockey goaltenders
Ice hockey people from Moscow
Ice hockey players at the 2006 Winter Olympics
Ice hockey players at the 2018 Winter Olympics
Olympic ice hockey players of Russia
HC Tornado players